Bénin competed at the 2011 World Championships in Athletics from August 27 to September 4 in Daegu, South Korea.
A team of 2 athletes was
announced to represent the country
in the event.

Results

Men

Women

References

External links
Official local organising committee website
Official IAAF competition website

Nations at the 2011 World Championships in Athletics
World Championships in Athletics
Benin at the World Championships in Athletics